William Severn (Los Angeles, 17 January 1938Ventura County, 26 March 1983) was an American child screen actor.

He was born William Churchill Roosevelt Severn, the son of Dr. Clifford Brill Severn (1890-1981) and his South African wife Rachel Malherbe (1897-1984). His parents had emigrated from South Africa to Los Angeles before he was born. He had seven siblings who were all child actors: Venetia Severn, Clifford Severn, Yvonne Severn, Raymond Severn, Ernest Severn, Christopher Severn and Winston Severn.

In 1957, Bill was captain of the Los Angeles Valley football team. With several of his siblings, he also worked part time in the family business, Severn Sporting Goods.

As an adult, he was a world-known evangelist, based in Ventura, California. His ministry took him and his family abroad, including Indonesia during the 1965 revolution, Israel, and the UK. He broadcast in the USA by the Trinity Broadcasting Network. He died in 1983 from a sudden heart attack at age 45. He was laid to rest in Pierce Brothers-Valley Oaks Memorial Park, in Westlake Village, California, beside his mother.

William Severn was known in his early films as the 'Little Billy Severn'. He made his first film appearance as Billy in Eagle Squadron, but his biggest role was as Peter Humphreys in Journey for Margaret.

Filmography

References

External links
 
 

1938 births
1983 deaths
20th-century American male actors
American male film actors
Burials at Valley Oaks Memorial Park
Male actors from Los Angeles
People from Ventura, California